Many of South America's top footballers and prolific goal scorers have played for the Chilean club Colo-Colo (Club Social y Deportivo Colo-Colo) over the years.

Players
  John Crawley

Player records

Primera División Topscorers
 Luis Carvallo: 9 (1933)
 Aurelio Domínguez: 12 (1935)
 Alfonso Domínguez: 32 (1939), 19 (1944)
 George Robledo: 26 (1953), 25 (1954)
 Luis Hernán Álvarez: 37 (1963)
 Julio Crisosto: 28 (1974)
 Carlos Caszely: 20 (1979), 26 (1980), 20 (1981)
 Rubén Martínez: 22 (1990), 23 (1991)
 Aníbal González: 24 (1992)
 Héctor Tapia: 24 (2001)
 Sebastián González: 18 (2002 Apertura)
 Manuel Neira: 14 (2002 Clausura)
 Gonzalo Fierro: 13 (2005 Clausura)
 Humberto Suazo: 19 (2006 Apertura)
 Humberto Suazo: 18 (2007 Apertura)
 Lucas Barrios: 19 (2008 Apertura)
 Lucas Barrios: 18 (2008 Clausura)

International Topscores
 Carlos Caszely: 9 (1973 Copa Libertadores)
 Humberto Suazo: 10 (2006 Copa Sudamericana)
 Matías Fernández: 9 (2006 Copa Sudamericana)

The World's Top Goal Scorer
 Humberto Suazo: 35 (2006)
 Lucas Barrios: 37 (2008)

South American Player of the Year
 Gabriel Mendoza (1991)
 Marco Antonio Etcheverry (1993)
 Matías Fernández (2006)
 Humberto Suazo (2006)

South American Footballer of the Year
 Matías Fernández (2006)

References 

Colo-Colo players, List of
 
Association football player non-biographical articles